Blaise Hamlet is a group of nine small cottages around a green in Henbury, now a district in the north of Bristol, England. All the cottages, and the sundial on the green are Grade I listed buildings. Along with Blaise Castle the Hamlet is listed, Grade II*, on the Register of Historic Parks and Gardens of special historic interest in England. Nikolaus Pevsner described Blaise Hamlet as "the ne plus ultra of picturesque layout and design".

Blaise Hamlet was built around 1811 for retired employees of Quaker banker and philanthropist John Scandrett Harford, who owned Blaise Castle House.

The hamlet was designed by John Nash, master of the Picturesque style. He had worked for Harford on other buildings. The hamlet is the first fully realised exemplar of the garden suburb and laid out the road map for virtually all garden suburbs that followed. The cottages are all unique and include brick chimneys and dormer windows with some having thatched roofs. They are examples of the Picturesque style, an aesthetic ideal introduced into English cultural debate in 1782 by William Gilpin. An oval path links the cottages and encircles the village green with its sundial. The cottage gardens are planted in a Victorian cottage garden style.

Since 1943 the cottages have been owned by the National Trust. They are still occupied and not open to the public, but the ensemble may be viewed from the green. Rose Cottage is let by the National Trust as a holiday cottage.

Buildings

See also 
 Storybook house

References

External links 

Blaise Hamlet information at the National Trust

Houses in Bristol
Tourist attractions in Bristol
National Trust properties in Bristol
Grade I listed buildings in Bristol
Grade I listed houses
Houses completed in 1811
Hamlets in England
Henbury
Grade II* listed parks and gardens in Bristol
Georgian architecture in Bristol
Grade I listed residential buildings
Cottage orné